This page provides supplementary chemical data on Lithium chloride.

Solubility

Thermodynamic properties

Spectral data

Structure and properties data

Temperature Relative Humidity over saturated solution in water

Material Safety Data Sheet 

The handling of this chemical may incur notable safety precautions. It is highly recommend that you seek the Material Safety Datasheet (MSDS) for this chemical from a reliable source  such as SIRI, and follow its directions.

References

Chemical data pages
Chemical data pages cleanup